West Florence is an unincorporated community in Preble County, in the U.S. state of Ohio.

History
West Florence was originally called Florence, and under the latter name was platted in 1835. A post office called West Florence was established in 1837, and remained in operation until 1906.

References

Unincorporated communities in Preble County, Ohio
Unincorporated communities in Ohio